Life FM (also Life FM 100.6FM) is a South African registered Non Profit  Company (NPC) Christian community radio station based in the North West.

The station was granted a broadcasting licence from ICASA

Coverage areas and frequencies 
In the Matlosana area. 25 km radius from Klerspdorp (checked April 2013), with an aim to get a 70 km radius.

Broadcast languages
English (70%)
Afrikaans (20%)
Tswana (10%)

Programme format
60% Music
40% Talk

References

External links
Life FM Website
Life FM Facebook Page
SAARF Website
Sentech Website

Community radio stations in South Africa
Mass media in North West (South African province)